is a Japanese footballer currently playing as a centre-back for Iwaki FC.

Club career
In March 2019, Egawa moved to Brazilian side Londrina-PR on loan, alongside teammate Kohei Hattori. At the end of the following season, it was announced that Egawa would move to fellow Japanese side Iwaki FC ahead of the 2021 season.

Career statistics

Club
.

Notes

References

2000 births
Living people
People from Ōtsu, Shiga
Association football people from Shiga Prefecture
Japanese footballers
Association football defenders
Japan Football League players
J3 League players
J2 League players
Kyoto Sanga FC players
Iwaki FC players
Londrina Esporte Clube players
Japanese expatriate footballers
Japanese expatriate sportspeople in Brazil
Expatriate footballers in Brazil